Tether Rock is a rock outlier 1 nautical mile (1.9 km) north of Lindstrom Ridge in the Darwin Mountains. The rock marks the north margin of ice-covered Access Slope, a route through the Circle Icefall of upper Darwin Glacier. Named in association with Lindstrom Ridge, to which Tether Rock appears to be subglacially connected.

Rock formations of Oates Land